The election for the Sixteenth Legislative Assembly of Uttar Pradesh, a multi party contest, the Samajwadi party beating most of the exit polls which were pointing the hung assembly, secured a comfortable majority of 224 in a house of 403 outperforming the ruling BSP and other national parties, the INC and the BJP. The BSP strength in the assembly was greatly reduced to 80 seats, the BJP with 47 seats followed by the Congress with 28 seats. Mayawati, the incumbent Chief Minister tendered her resignation on 6 March 2012 marking the distinction of being the first to complete full five years in office.

List of Winning Candidates

Babban resigned on 8 October 2016.

Analysis 

The election was accompanied by high voting of 59.40%, with impressive women turnouts. The good performance of the SP getting a majority on its own showed that the people had voted for stability and it was largely attributed to the lengthy campaign by Akhilesh Yadav mainly on the issues of law and order and good administration. The promises made by the party in its manifesto also seemed to have swayed the voters towards them, however there were reports of violence from various places soon after the results started coming which had resulted the death of one boy. The Muslim-Yadav combined vote bank worked in favor of the SP since in more than 140 assembly constituencies the Muslim electorate played a role in victory of the candidates. The people seemed to have voted against the BSP on issues of corruption, abuse of public money and Mayawati's alleged image as being unapproachable. The result also showed that the parties SP and BSP had merely exchanged their vote percentage differences during this election and previous election.
The defeat of the two national parties the Congress and the BJP was noted by the international media, even the two parties had performed well in 2009 general elections in the state. The reasons accounted of failure to offer as an alternative to the BSP, lack of chief ministerial candidate and proper leadership at the ground level. The lacklustre campaign headed by Rahul Gandhi and Uma Bharti also resulted to their losses. The election result had also put the campaigning style of Rahul Gandhi in question as he was in charge of the party and was earlier credited for party's victory in 2009 elections in the state. The defeat of the parties also showed their ill-preparedness for 2014 general elections with the rise of the regional parties. It also indicated that the central government headed by the Congress will be more at pressure from its allies, particularly the SP which is supporting the coalition at the center especially in cases of economic measures taken by the UPA government.
The electorate seems to have partly rejected candidates with criminal backgrounds along with some from political families.

See also
Sixteenth Legislative Assembly of Uttar Pradesh

References

External links 
 Election Commission of India
 State Election Commission, Uttar Pradesh

State Assembly elections in Uttar Pradesh
2012 State Assembly elections in India
Results of State Assembly elections in India